Spaziani is an Italian surname. Notable people with the surname include:

Beatrice Spaziani (born 1984), Italian synchronized swimmer
Brenda Spaziani (born 1984), Italian diver
Frank Spaziani (born 1947), American football player and coach
Maria Luisa Spaziani (1923–2014), Italian poet
Monique Spaziani (born 1957), Canadian actress

Italian-language surnames